The Art of Captaincy is a book written by former cricketer Mike Brearley, first published in 1985 by Hodder and Stoughton Ltd. The book draws on his various experiences while captaining Middlesex and later leading England to the famous Ashes victory in 1981. Being the only cricket book which talks about and explores the various challenges a cricket team captain must surmount, it has often been referred to as a "treatise on captaincy". (Scott 2011)

References

1985 non-fiction books
Cricket books